Turtle Beach may refer to:

İztuzu Beach in Dalyan, Turkey, also known as Turtle Beach
Turtle Beach Corporation, an American sound card and headphone manufacturer
Turtle Beach (film), a 1992 Australian drama film
Turtle Beach (Florida) south of Sarasota
Turtle Beach, Northern Territory, Australia